This is a list of seasons played by Athletic Bilbao Femenino, Athletic Bilbao's women's section, in Spanish and European football, since the 2002–03 season, the first one as Athletic Bilbao.

Summary

References

women's seasons
Athletic Bilbao Women
Athletic Bilbao
Femenino seasons